Synod of Homberg consisted of the clergy, the nobility, and the representatives of cities, and was held October 20–22, 1526. The synod is remarkable for a premature scheme of democratic church government and discipline, which failed for the time, but contained fruitful germs for the future and for other countries. It was suggested by the disputations which had been held at Zürich for the introduction of the Zwinglian Reformation.

Even before Luther's dramatic appearance, the lords of the State in Germany, no less than in France and England, had extended their prerogatives into the sphere of ecclesiastical affairs. The decision of the Diet of Speyer, August 27, 1526, which allowed every sovereign authority, pending the meeting of a council, to decide matters of faith for itself and its province, recognizing its accountability to God and the emperor, conceded, even though in limited terms, a canonical basis for the application of territorialism in favor of the Reformation.

Landgrave Philip of Hesse had the sagacity to utilize the situation in a judicious manner and convened an assembly of spiritual and temporal estates at Homberg October 20, 1526, "to deal in the grace of the Almighty with Christian matters and disputes." The proceedings were opened in the church at Homberg on Sunday, Oct. 21. To promote discussion, the former Franciscan François Lambert, of Avignon, had put forth 158 articles of debate (paradoxa), which had already been posted on the church doors.

After the opening speech by the chancellor, Johann Feige, Lambert read his theses, and proceeded to substantiate them from Scripture and to enumerate the abuses of the Church. In the afternoon Adam Krafft, of Fulda, translated Lambert's theses into German, and challenged whoever found them at variance with God's Word to declare himself. Only the Franciscan prior Nicholas Ferber, of Marburg, came forward, and took the floor the following morning. He flatly contested the landgrave's authority to hold a synod, to undertake ecclesiastical changes, and to pass any measures in the affairs of the Christian faith; since this was altogether the privilege of the pope, the bishops, and the Church.

When the chancellor urged the duty of the civil authorities to abolish abuses and idolatry Ferber still more sharply contested the assembly's competency to deal with an ecclesiastical question, and finally he attacked the prince's character for laying hands on the goods of the Church. He did not succeed, however, in giving another turn to the proceedings; nor did he attempt to refute the proffered articles of debate. He soon afterward left Hesse, and issued at Cologne Assertiones trecentat ac viginti adversus Fr. Lamberti paradoxa impia; and subsequently Assertiones aliœ.

On the following day (Tuesday, October 23), when the synod was on the point of closing, there appeared unexpectedly Master Johann Sperber, of Waldau, near Kassel, who made a vain attempt to justify the invocation of Mary, the mother of Jesus Christ, by the Angelical salutation in the first chapter of Luke.

References
 Philip Schaff History of the Christian Church, Volume VII, 1882
 

Reformation in Germany
1526 in the Holy Roman Empire
History of Rhineland-Palatinate
1526 in Christianity